= DOT Europe =

DOT Europe (formerly EDiMA) is an organisation that brings together platform companies of all sizes from all relevant countries active in Europe. The organisation was founded in 2000 and currently has 22 members which include: Apple, Google, Facebook, TikTok, and Spotify. Benjamin Brake is the association's Director General.

DOT Europe logo used since 2026.
